John Arthur Ackroyd (October 3, 1949 – December 30, 2016) was an American murderer and suspected serial killer. In 1992, he was sentenced to five life terms in prison for the abduction and murder of Kaye Turner.

Biography
Ackroyd was raised in the small logging town of Sweet Home, Oregon. His parents worked as a maintenance man and as an office worker at the police department. He had an older and younger sister. During his school years, he was a loner who was bullied. His high school diploma indicated that he had been a "special education" student. He enlisted in the Army after having been accused of felony theft. He worked overseas as a mechanic and was caught stealing equipment.

In 1977, he began working for the state highway department along U.S. Route 20 that ran east to west across Oregon. He was responsible for clearing wrecks, helping people whose cars broke down on the highway, and maintenance. He married Linda Pickle in the mid-1980s. She had two children, Rachanda and Byron. They lived at Santiam Junction, a state highway division compound at Oregon 22 and U.S. Highway 20. Other highway workers lived there, but there were few children. After one year, the couple divorced, but they continued to live together with Linda's children. Ackroyd was abusive to both Byron and Rachanda. Rachanda disappeared on July 10, 1990.

His life had changed by early 1992. His relationship with Linda ended and he moved in with his mother in Sweet Home. Due to his connection with Rachanda's disappearance, many women at Santiam Junction were uncomfortable with his behavior and he began to work out of Corvallis.

Attacks and murders
In 1977, Ackroyd raped Marlene Gabrielsen. In 1978, along with an accomplice, Roger Dale Beck, abducted and murdered Kaye Turner. Roger Beck was also found guilty in the murder of Kaye Turner at a separate trial. Ackroyd's step-daughter Rachanda Pickle went missing in 1990. Ackroyd was charged with Rachanda's murder in 2013, and pleaded no contest.
Sheila Swanson and Melissa Sanders were murdered in 1992, in Lincoln County, Oregon. Just weeks later Ackroyd was arrested for the murder of Kaye Turner. Investigators Ron Benson and Linda Snow, with the Lincoln County District Attorney's Office were preparing to present the evidence against Ackroyd for the murders of Swanson and Sanders to the grand jury when Ackroyd passed away. The Oregonian newspaper and others have alleged that Ackroyd was involved in the murder of several more women.

Custody
Ackroyd was incarcerated in Oregon State Penitentiary. He died in prison in 2016.

See also
 List of serial killers in the United States

References

Further reading

External links
 John Arthur Ackroyd, Find a Grave

1949 births
2016 deaths
20th-century American criminals
American male criminals
American murderers of children
American people convicted of murder
American prisoners sentenced to life imprisonment
American rapists
Crime in Oregon
Criminals from Oregon
People convicted of murder by Oregon
People from Sweet Home, Oregon
Prisoners sentenced to life imprisonment by Oregon
Prisoners who died in Oregon detention
Suspected serial killers
Violence against women in the United States